Zhang Xiaoyu (Chinese: 张小宇; born 5 January 1985) is a Chinese football player.

Club career
In 2006, Zhang Xiaoyu started his professional footballer career with Liaoning Whowin in the Chinese Super League.  He made his league debut for Liaoning on 4 October 2007 in a game against Wuhan Guanggu, coming on as a substitute for Yang Shilin in the 46th minute.
In January 2013, Zhang was loaned to China League Two side Lijiang Jiayunhao until 31 June. In July 2014, Zhang was loaned to China League Two side Nanjing Qianbao until 31 December.

In 2015, Zhang signed for Shenyang Urban. In March 2017, Zhang transferred to League Two side Jilin Baijia.

Club career statistics 
Statistics accurate as of match played 13 October 2018.

Honours
Liaoning Whowin
China League One: 2009

References

1985 births
Living people
Chinese footballers
Footballers from Shenyang
Liaoning F.C. players
Yunnan Flying Tigers F.C. players
Chengdu Better City F.C. players
Liaoning Shenyang Urban F.C. players
Chinese Super League players
China League One players
China League Two players
Association football midfielders